Now, We Are Breaking Up is a South Korean romantic drama television series starring Song Hye-kyo, Jang Ki-yong, Oh Se-hun, Kim Joo-hun and Choi Hee-seo. Directed by Lee Gil-bok, with screenplay by Je In, and produced by Samhwa Networks and United Artists Agency, the series is about falling in love and breaking up between men and women. It  premiered on SBS TV on November 12, 2021, and aired every Friday and Saturday at 22:00 (KST) till January 8, 2022.

Synopsis
The series is story of love and break ups in the romantic world. It illustrates the present scenario in the context of fashion industry. Ha Yeong-eun (Song Hye-kyo) is a trendy team leader of design department of a fashion company called 'The One'. Yoon Jae-gook (Jang Ki-yong) is a successful freelance photographer.

Cast and characters

Main
 Song Hye-kyo as Ha Yeong-eun
38 years old, daughter of Kang Jung-ja and Ha Taek-soo, and a close friend of Hwang Chi-sook and Jeon Mi-sook, design team leader of a fashion company called 'The One'. She falls in love with Yoon Jae-gook 
 Jang Ki-yong as Yoon Jae-gook and Mr. J
32 years old, freelance fashion photographer 
 Choi Hee-seo as Hwang Chi-sook  
38 years old, design director of 'The One', the daughter of CEO Hwang, a high school classmate of Ha Young-eun and Jeon Mi-sook, and Hwang Chi-hyung's older sister. She falls in love with Seok Do-hoon 
 Kim Joo-hun as Seok Do-hoon
40 years old, representative of the talented PR company at the center of the trend.
 Park Hyo-joo as Jeon Mi-sook  
38 years old, Hwang Chi-sook and Ha Yeong-eun's high school classmate, and Kwak Soo-ho's wife. She gave up her career as a model to marry Kwak Soo-ho. 
 Yoon Na-moo as Kwak Soo-ho  
36 years old, deputy head of the planning team. Jeon Mi-sook's husband and Seok Do-hoon's colleague.

Supporting

People around 'The One'  
 Joo Jin-mo as Representative Hwang
68 years old, Hwang Chi-sook's and Hwang Chi-hyung's father, CEO of 'The One', and self-made man.
 Oh Se-hun as Hwang Chi-hyung
32 years old, New designer of 'The One' in the design team. He's the son of the CEO Hwang and Hwang Chi-sook's younger brother. 
 Jang Hyuk-jin as Go Gwang-soo  
55 years old, Head of the production department of 'The One'.
 Song Yoo-hyun as Oh In-ah  
32 years old, head of the design team of 'Lamont', the second brand of 'The One'. Also team leader of the launching brand 'Claire Mary'
 Kim Bo-jeong as Nam Na-ri 
30 years old, manager of the design team of 'The One'.
 Moon Joo-yeon as Ahn Seon-joo
29 years old, designer of Ha Yeong-eun's team, honest with her feelings and desires and expresses immediately.
 Shin Ha-young as Jung So-young, 25 years old, youngest member of Sono's design team

People around Ha Yeong-eun
 Choi Hong-il as Ha Taek-soo 
64 years old, middle school vice principal. He is about to retire in a month. Ha Young-eun's father.
 Nam Gi-ae as Kang Jeong-ja
67 years old, mother of Ha Young eun

People around the country 
 Cha Hwa-yeon as Min Hye-ok  
66 years old. Jaeguk's mother. The youngest daughter of a retail family
 Yoon Jung-hee as Shin Yoo-jeong
40 years old, an influencer with over 600,000 Instagram followers and managing Director of Department Store 'Hills'.

Others 
 Yura as Hye-rin
29 years old, the best celebrity of the era with numerous followers. Real name Yang Eun-hee
 Ki Eun-se as Seo Min-kyeong 
33 years old. Vice President of Vision PR Marketing Team
 Kim Do-geon as Jimmy
The One's male casual advertising model
 Shin Dong-wook as Yoon Soo-wan
Yoon Jae Kook's older brother, who died in an accident 10 years ago, and Ha Young Eun's ex-boyfriend. 
 Park Bo-kyung as Choi Ji-yeon
Once a colleague of Ha Young-eun at the fashion company 'The One', now the president of an LP bar. Her shop became Ha Young-eun's hideout
 Choi Hyo-eun as Lee Seong-min
 Lee Jung-gil as Yoon Seong-cheol, Jae-gook's father
 Kim Young-ah as Choi Hee-ja, A very close and special person who has been working with Ha Young-eun for a long time.

Special appearance
 Lee Do-yeop as Choi Kyung-chan
 Hwang Chan-sung as Kim Soo-min

Production
Samhwa Networks has signed an 8.96 billion contract with StudioS (Subsidiary-SBS) to produce the drama, (560 million won per episode). Kang Eun-kyung is creator of the series.

On June 23, 2020, Huayi Brothers announced that Soo Ae has been offered to appear in the drama and she was considering the proposal, but eventually she declined. In November 2020, it was reported by United Artists Agency, Song Hye-kyo's management company, that she was considering to appear in the drama as protagonist. She last appeared in 2018 TV series Encounter. Yoon Jung-hee is returning to TV dramas after a hiatus of 7 years, she last starred in 2014 drama The Eldest. On 10 March, the line up of the cast appearing in drama was confirmed as: Song Hye-kyo, Jang Ki-yong, Choi Hee-seo, Kim Joo-hun, Nam Gi-ae, Choi Hong-il, Joo Jin-mo, Cha Hwa-yeon, Jang Hyuk-jin, Song Yoo-hyun, Lee Joo-myung, Park Hyo-joo, Yoon Na-moo and Yoon Jung-hee. Ki Eun-se, Kim Do-geon, Yura, Oh Se-hun and Shin Dong-wook joined the cast later. On September 30, photos from script reading site were released for public.

Filming
Song Hye-kyo started filming for the drama in Seoul on April 9, 2021. This is her first project after a two year hiatus.

The location shooting of drama is taking place at Incheon Culture & Arts Center, located at Songdo International Business District. Art Center is set up as the headquarters of the fashion company 'The One', that forms the background of the story of the drama. It was reported on July 20 that Yoon Jung-hee was confirmed for the Covid-19 contagion. As her schedule before confirmation didn't overlap, so filming was not stopped. Filming was finished on September 12, 2021. Production presentation of the series for promotion has been pre-recorded due to enlistment of actor Jang Ki-yong in August 2021, prior to release of the series.

Music
On November 8, original soundtrack line-up was revealed as:
 "You for a Moment" - Lee Mu-jin
 "Hold My Hand" - Lee Hi
 "Even the green season is meaningless to me" - Jung Seung-hwan
 "Only You" - Davichi  
 "Street" - Urban Zakapa   
 "Stay" - Car, the Garden
 "Because for Me, It's You" - Baekho (NU'EST)
 "Maybe It's Love" - Lee Min-hyuk and Bora Miyu-sing 
 "The Season Called You" - 20 year old
 "I Miss You" - Song Yu-jin

Release
The series premiered on November 12, 2021 and airs every Friday and Saturday at 22:00 (KST).

International broadcast
On June 1, 2021, SBS announced that the broadcasting rights for the drama Now, We Are Breaking Up were already sold in Japan.

During the earning call, Viu announced that they will stream Now, We Are Breaking Up as part of Viu Original Series in November, following their previous releases such as River Where the Moon Rises and Doom at Your Service. Samhwa Networks has reported earlier that they've sold the broadcasting rights to Viu parent company PCCW Media in Asian & MENA territories ex-Korea, Japan and China until August 4, 2031.

Now, We Are Breaking Up is also available on Rakuten Viki on selected regions such as North America, South America, Europe, Oceana and India.

Original soundtrack

Part 1

Part 2

Part 3

Part 4

Part 5

Part 6

Part 7

Part 8

Part 9

Part 10

Part 11

Viewership 
 Audience response

Notes

Awards and nominations

References

External links

  
 Now, We Are Breaking Up at Naver 
 Now, We Are Breaking Up at Daum 
 
 

Seoul Broadcasting System television dramas
2021 South Korean television series debuts
2022 South Korean television series endings
Korean-language television shows
South Korean romance television series
Television series by Samhwa Networks
South Korean pre-produced television series
Korean-language Viu (streaming media) exclusive international distribution programming